The Home Stretch is a surviving 1921 American silent drama film directed by Jack Nelson and written by Louis Stevens. The film stars Douglas MacLean, Beatrice Burnham, Walt Whitman, Margaret Livingston, Wade Boteler, Mary Jane Irving, and Charles Hill Mailes. Its screenplay was written by Louis Stevens and is based upon the short story "When Johnny Comes Marching Home" by Charles Belmont Davis, which appeared in the October 1914 issue of Metropolitan Magazine. The film was released on April 24, 1921, by Paramount Pictures.

Cast 
Douglas MacLean as Johnny Hardwick
Beatrice Burnham as Margaret Warren
Walt Whitman as Mr. Warren
Margaret Livingston as Molly
Wade Boteler as Mr. Duffy
Mary Jane Irving as Gwen Duffy
Charles Hill Mailes as Mr. Wilson 
Mollie McConnell as Mrs. Wilson (*posthumous release for Mollie who died in 1920)
Jack Singleton as Tommy Wilson
Joseph Bennett as Hi Simpkins 
George Holmes as Skeeter

Preservation status
Prints held at the UCLA Film and Television Archive, Library of Congress, and Academy Film Archive.

References

External links 

 
 

1921 films
1920s English-language films
Silent American drama films
1921 drama films
Paramount Pictures films
Films directed by Jack Nelson
American black-and-white films
American silent feature films
1920s American films